is a 2015 Japanese thriller film directed by Yukihiko Tsutsumi and based on the novel of the same name by Keigo Higashino. It was released on September 12, 2015.

Cast
Yōsuke Eguchi
Masahiro Motoki
Yukie Nakama
Gō Ayano
Jun Kunimura
Akira Emoto
Ken Mitsuishi
Renji Ishibashi

Reception
The film grossed  on its opening weekend and was number three at the box office.

References

External links
 

2010s Japanese-language films
2015 thriller films
Japanese thriller films
Films directed by Yukihiko Tsutsumi
Films based on Japanese novels
Films based on works by Keigo Higashino
Shochiku films
2010s Japanese films